Isa Khan Main, also written Mabin or Mohin, was a Punjabi Muslim warlord of the cis-Sutlej territory in the Mughal empire. He is credited with the killing of the Mughal prince Azam Shah during the Battle of Jajau, and for establishing an independent territory that defied Mughal authority.

Isa Khan belonged to the Main Rajput tribe of the Jalandhar Doab. He collected an armed retinue, grabbing the land of others and plundering trade caravans. He constructed the Isa Khan Kot. During the Battle of Jajau, he served Shah Alam I and struck Azam Shah with a bullet to the head. For his military services in helping enthrone Jahandar Shah, he was made a mansabdar of 5000, and the deputy Faujdar of the Doab. However, he forcibly collected rent for himself and the imperial officers were not able to collect from the jagirs in the region. In 1718, he rose in rebellion against Abd al-Samad Khan, instigated by  Khan-i Dauran. He gained control of the land extending from Badresa at the Beas river to his headquarters at Tihara along the Sutlej. He killed Kapura Brar, the chief of Kotkapura and an ancestor of the dynasty of the Faridkot state. He plundered the caravans of Delhi and Lahore.

References

Mughal Empire people